Bystrinsky Golets, also known as Barun-Shabartuy, is a mountain in the Chikokon Range. Administratively it is part of the Transbaikal Krai, Russian Federation.

The mountain was officially declared a natural monument in 1988.

Geography
It is located in the western part of the highlands, just a little north of the border with Mongolia. the Bystrinsky Golets is a ‘’golets’’-type of mountain with a bald peak that rises just above the source of the Chikoy River. The Bystrinsky Golets is part of the Chikoy National Park.

See also
List of mountains in Russia

References

Khentei-Daur Highlands